KVLO (101.7 FM, JACK FM) is a radio station in Humnoke, Arkansas and serves the Little Rock area. it airs an adult hits format, branded as "101.7 Jack FM".

History
On July 3, 2012, KVLO split from its simulcast with gospel-formatted KPZK-FM 102.5 Cabot, Arkansas and changed their format to adult hits, branded as "101.7 Jack FM".

References

External links

Classic hits radio stations in the United States
Jack FM stations
Lonoke County, Arkansas
Radio stations established in 1995
VLO
1995 establishments in Arkansas